|}

References

Buildings and structures in Cebu